The Hohe Salve is a well-known mountain located between Kufstein, Wörgl and Kitzbühel in the Austrian state of Tyrol. It is part of the Kitzbühel Alps and is also nicknamed the Rigi of the Tyrol. From the top the Großglockner and Großvenediger can also be made out.

Characteristics 

The mountain has a very striking conical appearance. On the summit is an old pilgrimage chapel, a restaurant and a transmission mast. In addition the peak is served by two gondola lifts from Söll and Hopfgarten.
The summit restaurant and church belong to the parish of Westendorf; the transmission mast to Hopfgarten.

In winter the Hohe Salve is part of the Skiwelt Wilder Kaiser/Brixental ski region and there are several runs from the top into the surrounding villages of Söll, Itter, Hopfgarten and Brixen im Thale.

Because of its shape and location the Hohe Salve is also a popular start point for paragliders.

The name is probably a Rhaeto-Romance term.

Hohe Salve transmission mast 
The Hohe Salve transmitter stands on the territory of Hopfgarten and is operated by ORS. It broadcasts to northeast Tyrol, parts of the district of Miesbach and the district of Rosenheim in Bavaria as well as a small part of western Salzburg state.

Gallery

References

External links 

Die Kröte auf der Hohen Salve – a legend at www.sagen.at 

Mountains of the Alps
Mountains of Tyrol (state)
One-thousanders of Austria
Kitzbühel Alps
Christian pilgrimages
Ski areas and resorts in Austria
Radio technology
Kitzbühel District
Tourist attractions in Tyrol (state)